Mount Rowan is a locality in western Victoria, Australia. At the 2021 census, Mount Rowan and the surrounding area had a population of 295.

References

Towns in Victoria (Australia)